Nikudin Rock (‘Skala Nikudin’ \ska-'la ni-ku-'din\) is the high, round rock of diameter 180 m and split in northeast-southwest direction, lying off the north coast of Greenwich Island in the South Shetland Islands.  The area was visited by early 19th century sealers.

The rock is named after the settlement of Nikudin in Southwestern Bulgaria.

Location
British mapping in 1968 and Bulgarian mapping in 2009.

Maps
 Livingston Island to King George Island.  Scale 1:200000.  Admiralty Nautical Chart 1776.  Taunton: UK Hydrographic Office, 1968.
 L.L. Ivanov. Antarctica: Livingston Island and Greenwich, Robert, Snow and Smith Islands. Scale 1:120000 topographic map. Troyan: Manfred Wörner Foundation, 2009.  (Second edition 2010)
Antarctic Digital Database (ADD). Scale 1:250000 topographic map of Antarctica. Scientific Committee on Antarctic Research (SCAR). Since 1993, regularly upgraded and updated.

References
 Bulgarian Antarctic Gazetteer. Antarctic Place-names Commission. (details in Bulgarian, basic data in English)
 Nikudin Rock. SCAR Composite Antarctic Gazetteer.

External links
 Nikudin Rock. Copernix satellite image

Rock formations of Greenwich Island
Bulgaria and the Antarctic